C.C. Adcock is the debut album by the Louisianan swamp-rock musician of the same name, released in 1994 on Island Records. It was recorded mainly in Lafayette, Louisiana and Los Angeles, California. A review of the album in Guitar Player said that it "delivers a heady brew of swamp riffs wrapped in slapback echo, slippery tremolo, and other exotic sounds".

Track listing
Couchemal	– 4:19  (C.C. Adcock)
Beaux's Bounce – 	2:15 (Ellis McDaniel)
Cindy Lou	– 2:20 (Eddie Shuler, Shelton Dunaway)
What I Like (Women's) – 	4:56 (Adcock)
Sally Sue Brown	– 2:26 (Arthur Alexander, Earl Montgomery, Tom Stafford)
Kissin' Kouzans – 	3:54 (Adcock)
I'm Just A Fool To Care	– 3:00 (Art Neville)
Good Lovin'	– 2:01 (Bobby Charles Guidry)
Do Right Lil' Lady	– 3:54 (Adcock)
Done Most Everything	– 5:34 (Adcock, Guidry)

References

1994 debut albums
Island Records albums
Blues rock albums by American artists